Pagodroma may refer to:

 Snow petrel (Pagodroma nivea), a bird that breeds on the Antarctic Peninsula and various Antarctic islands
 Pagodroma Gorge, a gorge in the Prince Charles Mountains, Antarctica